J.C. Khoury is an American commercial and film director who has won numerous awards for his broadcast television and branded content work. After graduating from Columbia University, Khoury enrolled in New York University's prestigious graduate film program where he studied under Spike Lee. His short film Michael Bell (2001) premiered at the Slamdance Film Festival and won the coveted Anarchy Award. StudioNext commissioned a web series written, produced, and directed by Khoury based on the title character. Khoury's short film Model Chaser (2002) won the Hamptons International Film Festival Student Film Award.

J.C. Khoury edited The Outsider (2005), starring Robert Downey Jr., the critically acclaimed documentary about maverick filmmaker James Toback. Khoury's commercial work is part of the permanent collection of the MoMA. Some clients for Khoury's commercial work include Avaya, Mountain Dew, T-Mobile, Comcast, Cablevision, Time Warner Cable, Swiffer, Cotton, First Interstate Bank, Western & Southern Financial Group, and The Washington Post.

J.C. Khoury produced and directed his debut feature film The Pill (2011), based on a screenplay he wrote, in the summer of 2010. The film stars Noah Bean, Rachel Boston, Anna Chlumsky, and Dreama Walker. His second feature film, All Relative (2014), premiered at the Woodstock and Austin Film Festivals before having a day and date theatrical/VOD release on November 21, 2014. The film stars Connie Nielsen, Jonathan Sadowski, and Sara Paxton and became an indie bestseller on iTunes. Khoury served as an Executive Producer on the film Return To Sender (2015) starring Academy Award Nominee Rosamund Pike and Nick Nolte.

References

http://www.shootfirstentertainment.com/
http://www.losthighwayfilms.com
https://web.archive.org/web/20100727021832/http://www.feverfilms.ca/

American people of Arab descent
Living people
Year of birth missing (living people)